Following is a list of Vietnamese restaurants:

 An Xuyên Bakery, Portland, Oregon, U.S.
 Ba Bar, Seattle, Washington
 Bambū
 Berlu, Portland, Oregon
 Dong Phuong Oriental Bakery, New Orleans, Louisiana, U.S.
 Double Dragon, Portland, Oregon
 Fish Sauce, Portland, Oregon
 Ha VL, Portland, Oregon
 Hanoi Kitchen, Portland, Oregon
 Hello Em, Seattle
 Kim Sơn, Houston, Texas, U.S.
 Lee's Sandwiches
 Lúc Lắc Vietnamese Kitchen, Portland, Oregon
 Mai's, Houston, Texas
 Mama Đút, Portland, Oregon
 Matta, Portland, Oregon
 Monsoon, Washington
 Pho 75
 Phở Bắc
 Phở Hòa
 Phở Kim, Portland, Oregon
 Pho Oregon, Portland, Oregon
 Pho Van
 Phởcific Standard Time, Seattle
 Rose VL Deli, Portland, Oregon
 Saigon Deli, Seattle
 Saigon Vietnam Deli, Seattle
 ShopHouse Southeast Asian Kitchen
 Stateside, Seattle
 Tamarind Tree, Seattle
 Tapalaya, Portland, Oregon
 Thơm Portland, Portland, Oregon

Lists of ethnic restaurants
Restaurants